The Shrivatsa (IAST: Śrīvatsa) is an ancient symbol, considered auspicious in Hinduism and other Indian religious traditions.

Hinduism

Origin 
Shrivatsa means "Beloved of Shri", an epithet of Vishnu, and a reference to his consort, the goddess Lakshmi, also called Shri. It is a mark on the chest of Vishnu, where his consort is described to reside. 

The Bhagavata Purana explains the origin of this mark. The story goes that a number of maharishis once gathered on the banks of the river Sarasvati to perform a yajna. A dispute arose among these sages regarding the superiority of the members of the Trimurti: Brahma, Vishnu, or Shiva. The sage Bhrigu was appointed to discover the truth of this matter, and undertook this task by travelling to the abodes of these deities. He felt disrespected by Brahma when the latter was offended by the fact that he had taken his seat on a stool that was not offered to him. He grew anxious when Shiva rose to embrace him, which offered the deity offence as well. Bhrigu then journeyed to the abode of Vishnu:

In the legend of Tirumala, Vishnu's consort, Lakshmi, is offended by the fact that the sage had kicked her beloved, as well as insulted the region of her husband she is associated with the most. She furiously descends upon the earth, where Vishnu finds her as Padmavati, and remarries her in his avatar of Srinivasa. 

It is said that the tenth avatar of Vishnu, Kalki, will bear the Shrivatsa mark on his chest. 

Shrivatsa is one of the names of Vishnu in the Vishnu Sahasranamam. 

The symbol offers the deity another epithet, Śrīvatsalāñcchana, which translates to, "He who has the mark or scar of Śrīvatsa on his chest".

In popular culture 
Shrivatsa is a popular name in Andhra Pradesh, Telangana, Tamil Nadu and Karnataka.

Historical symbolism 
In South India, in the bronze sculptures made after circa 10th century, the Shrivatsa symbol is shown as an inverted triangle on the right chest of Vishnu, and his various incarnations.

Buddhism

In Buddhism, the śrīvatsa is said to be a feature of the tutelary deity (Tibetan: yidam) Mañjuśrī the Youth (Skt: Mañjuśrīkumārabhūta). 

In Tibetan Buddhism, the śrīvatsa (Tib: དཔལ་བེའུ་, Wyl: dpal be'u) is depicted as a triangular swirl or an endless knot. In the Chinese tradition, Buddhist prayer beads are often tied at the tassels in this shape. 

In some lists of the 80 secondary characteristics, it is said that a Buddha's heart is adorned with the śrīvatsa.

Jainism

In Jain iconography, Shrivatsa often marks the chest of the Tirthankara image. It is one of the Ashtamangala (eight auspicious symbols) found in Jainism. The canonical texts such as Hemchandra's Trīṣaṣṭiśalākāpuruṣacaritra and Mahapurana mentions it as one of the Ashtamangalas. Acharya Dinakara explains in his medieval work that the highest knowledge emerged from the heart of Tirthankaras in the form of Shrivatsa so they are marked as such. In North Indian Jain sculptures of the early centuries, it is marked in the centre of the chest.

Other uses
 
The Shrivatsa is the symbol of Rakhine State and the Rakhine people of Burma.

See also 
Cintamani Gem
Kaustubha Gem
Syamantaka Gem
Aurva

Notes

References

Further reading
 

Jain symbols
Hindu symbols
Symbols of Indian religions
Indian iconography